The 1989–90 Divizia B was the 50th season of the second tier of the Romanian football league system.

The format has been maintained to three series, each of them having 18 teams. At the end of the season the winners of the series promoted to Divizia A and the last three places from each series relegated to Divizia C.

A relegation play-off was played between the 15th places from each series, team ranked last also relegated to Divizia C: the relegation play-off was necessary due to the fall of communism in December 1989, culminating with the exclusion from Divizia A of Flacăra Moreni and Olt Scornicești, and 
the dissolution of Victoria București.

Team changes

To Divizia B
Promoted from Divizia C
 Foresta Fălticeni
 Viitorul Vaslui
 Olimpia Râmnicu Sărat
 Unirea Slobozia
 Autobuzul București
 Mecanică Fină București
 Constructorul Craiova
 Vagonul Arad
 Mureșul Explorări Deva
 IMASA Sfântu Gheorghe
 Steaua CFR Cluj
 Someșul Satu Mare

Relegated from Divizia A
 Oțelul Galați
 Rapid București
 ASA Târgu Mureș

From Divizia B
Relegated to Divizia C
 Metalul Plopeni
 Electroputere Craiova
 Minerul Cavnic
 FEPA 74 Bârlad
 Dacia Pitești
 Minerul Paroșeni
 Câmpulung Moldovenesc
 Dunărea Călărași
 Mecanica Orăștie
 Delta Tulcea
 Metalul Mangalia
 Avântul Reghin

Promoted to Divizia A
 Petrolul Ploiești
 Jiul Petroșani
 Politehnica Timișoara

Renamed teams
Steaua CFR Cluj was renamed as CFR Cluj.

Unirea Dinamo Focșani was renamed as Unirea Focșani.

Teams

League tables

Serie I

Serie II

Serie III

Relegation play-off
The 15th-placed teams from each series of Divizia B played a relegation play-off. The play-off was held in Bucharest and the team ranked last at the end of the tournament relegated to Divizia C.

Round 1

Round 2

Round 3

Top scorers 
12 goals
  Gabor Gerstenmajer (Olimpia Satu Mare)

9 goals
  Florin Constantinovici (Rapid București)
  Mihăiță Hanghiuc (Oțelul Galați)

8 goals
  Haralambie Antohi (Oțelul Galați)

7 goals
  Ion Profir (Oțelul Galați)

See also 
1989–90 Divizia A

References

Liga II seasons
Romania
2